Cold Feet is a 1983  American comedy film written and directed  by   Bruce Van Dusen  and starring  Griffin Dunne.

Plot

Cast 

 Griffin Dunne as  Tom Christo 
 Marissa Chibas as Marty Fenton
 Blanche Baker as Leslie Christo
 Marc Cronogue  as Bill
 Kurt Knudson 	 as Louis
 Joseph Leon 	 as Harold Fenton
 Marcia Jean Kurtz  as Psychiatrist
 Peter Boyden  as Dr. Birbrower
 Dan Strickler as TV Executive

References

External links 

1983 comedy films
1983 films
American comedy films
1980s English-language films
1980s American films